Robert Samuel Minton (4 January 1899 – 3 August 1928) was an English cricketer.  Minton's batting style is unknown.  He was born at Kensington, London, and was educated at Brighton College.

Minton made a single first-class appearance for Sussex against Northamptonshire at the County Ground, Northampton, in the 1919 County Championship.  Northamptonshire won the toss and elected to bat first, posting a total of 410.  In reply, Sussex could only manage 125, with Minton making 24 runs before he was dismissed by Albert Wright.  His score was the second highest individual score in Sussex's innings.  Forced to follow-on, Sussex improved in their second-innings to make 365, though Minton himself was dismissed without scoring by William Wells. Northamptonshire went on to win the match by 8 wickets, in what was Minton's only major appearance for Sussex.

He committed suicide near Three Bridges in Sussex on 3 August 1928, having thrown himself from the first-class compartment of a train on the Brighton Main Line. He had up to that point been employed as a police constable.

References

External links
Robert Minton at ESPNcricinfo

1899 births
1928 suicides
Sportspeople from Kensington
People educated at Brighton College
English cricketers
Sussex cricketers
British police officers
Suicides by train
Suicides in England